Ellauri is a surname. Notable people with the surname include:

José Eugenio Ellauri (1834–1894), Uruguayan politician, son of José
José Longinos Ellauri (1789–1867), Uruguayan politician
Oscar Secco Ellauri (1904–1990), Uruguayan politician and historian